Medion AG is a German consumer electronics company, and a subsidiary of Chinese multinational technology company Lenovo. The company operates in Europe, Turkey, Asia-Pacific, United States and Australia regions. The company's main products are computers and notebooks, but also smartphones, tablet computers, digital cameras, TVs, refrigerators, toasters, and fitness equipment.

Products
Medion products in Australia and the United States are available exclusively at Aldi and Super Billing Computers, with some products (such as DVD players) branded as Tevion (Aldi's own brand). Some of Medion's formal laptops were sold in North America at Best Buy stores and were sold in Canada at Future Shop as Cicero Computers.

In the United Kingdom, Medion products, including laptop and desktop computers, have been sold by Aldi, Sainsbury's, Somerfield, Woolworths, and Tesco, as well as being sold direct through Medion's own Web site and various other online retailers.

Medion launched Aldi Talk in Germany and MEDIONMobile as ALDIMobile in Australia in an agreement with Aldi Stores. Medion Australia Pty Limited remains as the owner of ALDIMobile.

In China Medion products are sold under the Lenovo brand, but not all Lenovo branded products are Medion products.

In Germany, Medion has launched a Cloud Gaming service in partnership with Gamestream in April 2020.

Sponsorship
Medion sponsored Sahara Force India through Formula One Team driver Adrian Sutil in Formula One in 2007 to 2011, until Sutil left the team. In 2013 Sutil returned to Sahara Force India, and Medion returned as a sponsor. Sutil and Medion left the sport at the end of 2013.

Medion brands 
Other brands used on Medion products:

Cybercom
Cybermaxx
Life
Lifetec
Micromaxx
Essenitel b
Ordissimo
ERAZER
PEAQ
QUIGG
These Medion products can be recognized by the serial number starting with "MD" or "LT".

Acquisition
On 1 June 2011, the Chinese multinational Lenovo Group (LNVGY) announced plans to acquire Medion AG. Since August 2011, they hold the majority stake in Medion.

References

External links 

 

Companies based in Essen
Companies established in 1983
Companies listed on the Frankfurt Stock Exchange
Computer hardware companies
Consumer electronics brands
Electronics companies of Germany
Home appliance brands
Home appliance manufacturers of Germany
Lenovo
Mobile phone manufacturers
Netbook manufacturers
2011 mergers and acquisitions